Sachse may refer to:
Sachse, Texas
People from Saxony
Anna Sachse-Hofmeister (1850–1904), Austrian opera singer
Arthur Sachse (1860–1920), Australian politician
Edward Sachse (1804-1873), artist and lithographer
Emma Sachse (1887–1965), German activist and politician
Frank Sachse (1917–1989), American basketball and football player
Jack Sachse, American football player
Jessica Sachse, German paralympic athlete
Jochen Sachse (born 1948), East German athlete, winner of silver medal in hammer throw at 1972 Olympics
Neil Sachse (1951–2020), Australian rules footballer
Rainer Sachse (born 1950), German footballer
Willy Sachse (1896-1944), German socialist

See also
Sachs, a surname

Ethnonymic surnames